The 37th People's Choice Awards, honoring the best in popular culture for 2010, were held on January 5, 2011 at the Nokia Theatre in Los Angeles, California, and were broadcast live on CBS at 9:00 pm ET. Queen Latifah was the host for the fifth consecutive year.

Performers
 Queen Latifah – "Dynamite" (with Taio Cruz's vocals)
 Selena Gomez & the Scene – "A Year Without Rain"
 Kid Rock – "God Bless Saturday"

Presenters
 Jennifer Aniston
 Ben Rappaport
 Mila Kunis
 Emma Roberts
 Kate Walsh
 Taye Diggs
 Jim Parsons
 Miranda Cosgrove
 Minka Kelly
 Pauley Perrette
 Stephen Moyer
 Malin Akerman
 Julie Bowen
 Michael Chiklis
 Ashton Kutcher
 Natalie Portman
 Zachary Levi
 AnnaLynne McCord
 Jerry O'Connell
Brian Palatucci

Nominees
Winners are listed in bold.

Film

Television

Music

Web

Notes

References

People's Choice Awards
2010 awards in the United States
2011 in American television
2011 in Los Angeles
January 2011 events in the United States